Eric Villalón Fuentes (born 30 April 1973 in Barcelona) is a Paralympic alpine skier from Spain. In his career, he has won five gold medals, three silvers, and a bronze. At the 1998 Winter Paralympics he won three golds, at the 2002 games he won two gold and two silvers, and at the 2006 Paralympics he won a silver and a bronze.

In 2014 Villalon was inducted into the Paralympic Hall of Fame.

Notes

External links 
Spanish Paralympics site Profile

Spanish male alpine skiers
Paralympic alpine skiers of Spain
Alpine skiers at the 1998 Winter Paralympics
Alpine skiers at the 2002 Winter Paralympics
Alpine skiers at the 2006 Winter Paralympics
Paralympic gold medalists for Spain
Paralympic silver medalists for Spain
Paralympic bronze medalists for Spain
1973 births
Living people
Medalists at the 2006 Winter Paralympics
Medalists at the 2002 Winter Paralympics
Medalists at the 1998 Winter Paralympics
Paralympic medalists in alpine skiing
21st-century Spanish people